Arnold L. Kirkpatrick (December 23, 1886 – April 5, 1953) was and American football player and coach.  He was the second head football coach at the Howard Payne University in Brownwood, Texas, serving for seven seasons, from 1917 to 1923, and compiling a record of 32–17–4.  Kirkpatrick played college football at the University of Texas at Austin, as a halfback and quarterback. He later worked as a lawyer in Brownwood, Texas.  He died in at a hospital in Brownwood, on April 5, 1953, after suffering a heart attack.

Head coaching record

References

External links
 

1886 births
1953 deaths
American football halfbacks
American football quarterbacks
Daniel Baker Hillbillies football coaches
Howard Payne Yellow Jackets football coaches
Texas Longhorns football players
Texas lawyers
People from Brownwood, Texas
People from Coleman County, Texas
Players of American football from Texas
20th-century American lawyers